The West Mesa Murders are the killings of eleven women whose remains were found buried in 2009 in the desert on the West Mesa of Albuquerque, New Mexico, United States. Several suspects have been named, but none were arrested or charged. While the killings were initially believed to be the work of a serial killer, the involvement of a sex trafficking ring has been suspected.

An anonymous tip to authorities at APD and FBI linked the murders to a suspect from Central America. Police have also suspected the involvement of a sex trafficking ring operating through neighboring Texas that targets sex workers during events throughout the Southwest, Southern, and Western United States, especially regularly scheduled events, such as the New Mexico state fair in this case, to take advantage of reliably heavier traffic. This small fragment of a human trafficking ring involves numerous population centers, including Las Vegas in Nevada, El Paso and Killeen in Texas, and Denver in Colorado.

Background
Between 2001 and 2005, 11 women were buried by an unknown assailant in an arroyo bank on Albuquerque's West Mesa, in an undeveloped area within city limits. Satellite imagery taken between 2003 and 2005 shows tire marks and patches of disturbed soils in the area where the remains were recovered. By 2006, development had encroached on the area, and soon after, the site was disturbed, buried, and platted for residential development.

Due to the 2008 housing bubble collapse, development on the West Side halted before housing could be built at the burial site. After neighbors complained of flooding at the platted site (due to the burial of the natural arroyo), the developer built a retaining wall to channel storm water to a retention pond built in the approximate area of the burial site, inadvertently exposing bones to the surface.

Discovery
On February 2, 2009, a woman walking a dog found a human bone on the West Mesa, and reported it to police. As a result of the subsequent police investigation, authorities discovered the remains of 11 women and girls and a fetus buried in the area. They were between 15 and 32 years of age, most were Hispanic, and most were involved with drugs and sex work.

Victims
The remains discovered in 2009 were identified as those of the following women and girls, all of whom disappeared between 2001 and 2005: 
 Jamie Barela, 15
 Monica Candelaria, 22
 Victoria Chavez, 26
 Virginia Cloven, 24
 Syllannia Edwards, 15
 Cinnamon Elks, 32
 Doreen Marquez, 24
 Julie Nieto, 24
 Veronica Romero, 28
 Evelyn Salazar, 27
 Michelle Valdez, 22

According to satellite photos, the last victim was buried in 2005.

Syllania Edwards, a 15-year-old runaway from Lawton, Oklahoma, was the only African American, and the only victim from out of state. Michelle Valdez was four months pregnant at the time of her death.

On December 9, 2010, Albuquerque police released six photos of seven other unidentified women who may also be linked to West Mesa. Police would not say how or where they had obtained the photos. Some of the women appear to be unconscious, and many share the same physical characteristics as the original 11 victims. The following day the police released an additional photograph of another woman; this woman was subsequently identified by family members, who reported that she had died of natural causes several years earlier. On December 13, 2010, police reported that two of the women in the photos had been identified as alive, and could have valuable information if they can be located. In June 2018, more bones were found near the site of the burials, but these were later determined to be ancient and not related to the West Mesa murders.

Suspects

Police suspect that the bodies were all buried by the same person or persons, and may be the work of a serial killer, who has since come to be referred to as the West Mesa Bone Collector.

No official suspects have ever been named in connection with the murders. In 2010, a reward of up to $100,000 was being offered for information leading to the arrest and conviction of the person or persons responsible.

Over time, a number of men have attracted police attention, though not named as full suspects, in connection with the murders. 

Fred Reynolds was a pimp who knew one of the missing women and reportedly had photos of missing sex workers; he died of natural causes in January 2009.

Lorenzo Montoya lived less than three miles from the burial site. In 2006 there were reportedly dirt trails leading from his trailer park to the site. He had twice been arrested for violent attacks on sex workers and had threatened to kill his girlfriend and bury her in lime. Co-workers said he had talked about killing women and burying them on the West Mesa. In December 2006, Montoya strangled a teenage sex worker to death at his trailer and then was shot to death by the teen's boyfriend. It would appear the killings stopped after his death.

In August 2010, police searched several properties in Joplin, Missouri associated with local photographer and businessman Ron Erwin in connection with the West Mesa cases. They confiscated "tens of thousands" of photos from the man, who reportedly used to visit the state fair in Albuquerque. Police confirmed that they had cleared Erwin as a suspect.

In December 2010, convicted Colorado serial killer Scott Lee Kimball stated that he was being investigated for the West Mesa murders, but he denied killing the women.

In 2014, a breakthrough on a decades-old case caused Albuquerque police to become interested in Joseph Blea as a suspect for the murders. Blea has been dubbed the "Mid-School Rapist" for his activities in the 1980s; police say he would often break into the homes of 13- to 15-year-old girls who lived near McKinley Middle School in Albuquerque and rape them. In one case, there was a DNA sample but the rape test kit was not re-tested until 2010, eventually linking Blea to the rape. In 2015, Blea was also suspected by police of killing a sex worker; his DNA sample was located on the inner waistband and belt of a sex worker found dead on Central Ave, a notorious street for sex work in the eastern part of the city. In addition, a tree tag from a nursery was found in the area where the West Mesa victims' bodies were buried; it was tracked to a nursery Blea once frequented. Blea had women's underwear and jewellery not belonging to his wife or daughter in his home and allegedly told a cellmate that he had hired the West Mesa victims, who he called "trashy". Blea, in the Mid-School rape case, was sentenced to 36 years in June 2015, at 58 years of age.

See also
List of fugitives from justice who disappeared
List of serial killers in the United States
List of solved missing person cases

References

External links
 City of Albuquerque official webpage pertaining to the West Mesa Homicide Investigation

2000s missing person cases
2003 murders in the United States
2004 murders in the United States
2005 murders in the United States
2009 in New Mexico
American serial killers
Crimes against sex workers in the United States
Crimes in New Mexico
Female murder victims
Formerly missing people
Mass graves
Missing person cases in New Mexico
Murder in New Mexico
People murdered in New Mexico
Serial murders in the United States
Unidentified American serial killers
Unsolved murders in the United States
History of women in New Mexico